Maine School Administrative District 3 (MSAD 3) is an operating school district within Maine, covering the towns of Brooks, Freedom, Jackson, Knox, Liberty, Monroe, Montville, Thorndike, Troy, Unity and Waldo. MSAU District 3 students attend Mount View High School in Thorndike.

References

External links

Mount View High School

03
03
Public elementary schools in Maine
Public middle schools in Maine
Public high schools in Maine